Arsenite methyltransferase is an enzyme that in humans is encoded by the AS3MT gene.

References

Further reading

External links 
 

EC 2.1.1